Konjiška Vas is a settlement in the Municipality of Slovenske Konjice in eastern Slovenia. It lies at the foot of the eastern end of the Mount Konjice hills southeast of Slovenske Konjice. The area is part of the traditional region of Styria. The municipality is now included in the Savinja Statistical Region.

A Roman-era archaeological site in the hamlet of Podmočle in the settlement has been partially excavated and identified as a possible site of a Villa rustica.

References

External links
Konjiška Vas at Geopedia

Populated places in the Municipality of Slovenske Konjice